Patsaouras Transit Plaza is a bus station on the east side of Union Station in Downtown Los Angeles, near the El Monte Busway. It was originally named the Gateway Transit Plaza but was renamed after Nick Patsaouras, former Rapid Transit District board member who was an advocate for public transportation.

The Metro Headquarters Building is located at the northern end of the plaza.

Services

Metro and municipal buses

 Los Angeles Metro Bus
 Antelope Valley Transit Authority
 City of Santa Clarita Transit
 Foothill Transit
 LADOT Commuter Express
 LADOT DASH
 University of Southern California shuttles
 Mount St. Mary's College shuttles
 City of Commerce Municipal Bus Lines
 Hollywood Bowl shuttle

Several other services' bus stops are located in or near the Patsaouras Transit Plaza:
 Big Blue Bus (Santa Monica) 
 Greyhound Lines
 J Line
 Silver Streak
 Torrance Transit

LAX FlyAway

LAX FlyAway service is offered between Union Station and Los Angeles International Airport. FlyAway buses run every 30 minutes between 5 am and 1 am and on the hour between 1 am and 5 am. Tickets are sold from a ticket kiosk at the southwest corner of the island platform.  It utilizes bus bay #1.

Long-distance motorcoach
Amtrak California operates several routes under the Amtrak Thruway brand from dedicated bus bays at the north side of Union Station, near the Subway sandwich shop, not from the Patsaouras Transit Plaza, which is on the other side of the facility.

Greyhound Lines operates its main Los Angeles station from the Patsaouras Transit Plaza. FlixBus boards across the street from Patsaouras, at the Vignes lot located northwest of the intersection of East Cesar Chavez Avenue and North Vignes Street.

J Line expansion

A new transitway station for the J Line and other transit buses operating on the El Monte Busway, including the Silver Streak, was built south of the Patsaouras Transit Plaza in the median of the El Monte Busway, after years of delays and budget increases.

The station allows buses traveling in both directions on the busway to serve Union Station with a minimum of delay for passengers for other destinations. A bridge allows for passengers to walk directly from the Patsaouras Transit Plaza to the busway station, thereby eliminating a long, convoluted walk across the Union Station property to the former stop located on the El Monte Busway at Alameda.

Construction on the station started in early 2017. Work on the station was halted on April 24, 2018, when archaeological and Native American artifacts were discovered at the site. Archaeological investigation field work was completed nearly a year later on April 12, 2019. Construction resumed in May 2019, with construction completed on November 1, 2020.

The project cost $51 million, well more than double the original estimate. The project was funded by tolls collected as a part of the Metro ExpressLanes project and a grant from the U.S. government.

References

Los Angeles Metro Busway stations
Los Angeles County Metropolitan Transportation Authority
Bus stations in Los Angeles County, California